First Capital REIT is a Canadian public real estate company, specializing in retail real estate, and based in Toronto, Ontario. It is one of the largest retail landlords in Canada.

History 
First Capital was founded in 1994 as Centrefund Realty through a 1994 IPO.  It started with 5 properties, and grew to 70 properties by 2000. In May 2000, Riocan Real Estate Investment Trust briefly entered discussions into buying First Capital. Gazit Group ended up acquiring the company, which was restructured and renamed First Capital Realty in 2001.

Gazit Group (now Gazit-Globe) was a significant shareholder in First Capital up until March 2020.

As of 2003, First Capital had 81 properties, after spinning off its American properties and acquiring 18 properties during the year.  In 2011, First Capital Realty bought Hazelton Lanes, a shopping centre in Yorkville, Toronto, for $110 million.

In December 2019, the company rebranded as First Capital REIT, and reorganized into a Real Estate Investment Trust

As of 2021, First Capital owns properties in over 150 Canadian neighbourhoods, consisting of over 200 properties, over 4,000 tenants and over 22.9 million square feet of gross leasable area.

Business 
First Capital primarily owns shopping centres in large urban areas across Canada.  As of Q1 2021, First Capital has properties in over 150 Canadian neighbourhoods, with 22.9 million square feet of gross leasable area with total enterprise valued at $10 Billion.  Major tenant groups include grocery stores (17.0% of Q1 2021 rent), medical & personal services (15.5%), restaurants (12.9%), pharmacies (9.3%), and banks (8.3%). The top 10 tenants in Q1 2021 were Loblaws, Sobeys, Metro, Canadian Tire, Walmart, TD Canada Trust, RBC, Save on Foods, Goodlife Fitness, and Dollarama.

First Capital has recently been shifting to mixed-use developments, as opposed to purely retail developments. As of Q1 2021, the average population density within 5 kilometers of FCR properties is 304,000, up 48% since 2016.

In September 2017, it was announced that First Capital was considering selling $500 million worth of properties in Ottawa and Toronto in which it has a partial interest. As of Q1 2021, 52% of the FCR portfolio is in the Greater Toronto and Greater Ottawa areas. 

In December 2019, FCR converted from a corporation to a real estate investment trust, listing on December 30 on the TSX as FCR.UN.

Sustainability and environmental responsibilities 
Since 2006, First Capital has engaged in several sustainability initiatives, starting with its commitment to develop all properties using Leadership in Energy and Environmental Design (LEED) standards.

In 2020, First Capital released its 2020-2024 Environmental, Social, and Governance (ESG) Roadmap, and Sustainability Policy, outlining current and future sustainability plans.

As of Q1 2021, FCR has achieved a 'AAA' rating in the Morgan Stanley Capital International (MSCI) ESG Ratings assessment for the third year in a row, a 4-star ranking by the Global Real Estate Sustainability Benchmark (GRESB) in 2020, awarded Silver 2020 Green Lease Leader Recognition by the Institute for Market Transformation (IMT) and the U.S. Department of Energy's Better Building Alliance, and received Prime Status for Corporate ESG Performance by the Institutional Shareholder Services 2020.

Properties 
Notable properties owned by First Capital include:

Ontario 
 102-108 Yorkville Avenue in Toronto
 101 Yorkville Avenue in Toronto
 Shops at King Liberty in Toronto 
Cedarbrae Mall in Scarborough
 Yorkville Village (formerly known as Hazelton Lanes) in Toronto

 One Bloor in Toronto
 Meadowvale Town Centre in Mississauga
 Parkway Mall in Scarborough
 College Square in Ottawa
 Merivale Mall in Ottawa
 Leaside Village in Toronto
 York Mills Gardens in Toronto
3080 Yonge Street in Toronto
King High Line in Toronto
1 Bloor East in Toronto
Yonge & Roselawn in Toronto
2150 Lakeshore Boulevard West (formerly known as the Christie Cookie Site) in Toronto

Quebec 

 Place Portobello in Brossard
 Place Panama in Brossard

 Centre Domaine in Montreal
 Galeries Normandie in Montreal.
 Carre Lucerne in Montreal
 Place Viau in Montreal
 Wilderton Centre in Montreal
 Griffintown 225 Peel in Montreal
 Griffintown 100 Peel in Montreal

Alberta 
 Mount Royal Village in Calgary
 Edmonton Brewery District Edmonton
 Northgate Centre in Edmonton
 Westmount Centre in Edmonton

British Columbia 
 Semiahmoo Shopping Centre in Surrey
 Shops at New West in New Westminster
 False Creek Village in Vancouver

References 

Companies based in Toronto
Companies listed on the Toronto Stock Exchange
Real estate companies of Canada
Real estate investment trusts of Canada